Kerukan may refer to:
 Kerukan, Hormozgan
 Kerukan, Markazi